The Coptic Orthodox Church in Mexico represents adherents, religious communities, institutions and organizations of Coptic Orthodox Church in Mexico. 

Mexico has a growing Coptic Orthodox community, as it was less than one decade ago when some Coptic families settled in Mexico. The first Coptic Orthodox church in Mexico is St. Mary and St. Mark's Coptic Orthodox Church in Tlaycapan, Mexico. It was founded in 2001 and measures about 2000 square meters. The current priest is Father Zakaria Al Bramousy.

See also
Coptic
Coptic Orthodox Church
Coptic Orthodox Church in North America
List of Coptic Orthodox Churches in the United States
St. Mark Coptic Orthodox Church (Jersey City, New Jersey)
St. Mark Coptic Orthodox Church (Los Angeles)
St. Mary Coptic Orthodox Church (Los Angeles)
St. Abraam Coptic Orthodox Church (Woodbury, New York)
Religion in North America
Coptic diaspora
Oriental Orthodoxy in North America

References

Coptic Orthodox Church in North America
Religious organizations based in Mexico
Oriental Orthodoxy in Mexico